IOC most commonly refers to the International Olympic Committee.

IOC may also refer to:

Computing
IBM Open Class, IBM C++ product
Indicator of compromise (IoC), an artifact likely indicating a computer intrusion
Inversion of control (IoC), a software design pattern

Other
Icon of Coil, Norwegian electronic music band
Immediate or cancel, a type of order used on some stock exchanges
Index of coincidence, In cryptography, the technique of counting the number of times that identical letters appear
Indian Ocean Commission, generally COI, but according to World Bank as well IOC
Indian Oil Corporation, large Indian oil and gas company 
Indian Orthodox Church, Kerala, India 
International Olive Council
Initial operating capability, minimum level of deployment, especially in the US military 
Initiative on Cities, urban research institute at Boston University 
Initiatives of Change, international organisation "building trust across the world's divides" (formerly Moral Re-Armament) 
Intergovernmental Oceanographic Commission of Unesco
International Oil Company, as opposed to NOC, which stands for National Oil Company
International Ornithological Committee, former name of the International Ornithologists' Union
International Order of Characters
Intraoral camera, a device used to take photos of the inside of a patient's mouth
Iron Ore Company of Canada
Italian organized crime